Matt Leacock is an American board game designer, most known for cooperative games such as Pandemic, Pandemic Legacy: Season 1, Forbidden Island and Forbidden Desert.

Early life 
Leacock grew up in Long Lake, Minnesota. He studied visual communication at Northern Illinois University.

Career 
Matt designed Pandemic, published in 2008 by Z-Man Games. Leacock had previously worked as a developer of social media and as a user experience designer, primarily in community and communications products for AOL and Yahoo. He switched to designing board games full time in July 2014.

Pandemic Legacy: Season 1, which Leacock co-designed with Rob Daviau, has been rated very highly among board gamers and by the website Board Game Geek on its board game rankings. His latest games are Pandemic Fall of Rome and Forbidden Sky (both released in 2018).

Leacock is developing a tabletop game about climate change, Daybreak.

Games 

 Pandemic (2008)
 Roll Through the Ages: The Bronze Age (2008)
 Pandemic: On the Brink (Expansion) (2009)
 Forbidden Island (2010)
 Forbidden Desert (2013)
 Pandemic: In The Lab (Expansion) (2013)
 Pandemic: The Cure (2014)
 Pandemic: State of Emergency (Expansion) (2015)
 Pandemic Legacy: Season 1 (2015)
 Thunderbirds (2015)
 Knit Wit (2016)
 Pandemic: Reign of Cthulhu (2016)
 Pandemic Iberia (2016)
 Chariot Race (2016)
 Space Escape (formerly Mole Rats in Space) (2017)
 Pandemic: Rising Tide (2017)
 Pandemic Legacy: Season 2 (2017)
 Pandemic Fall of Rome (2018)
 Forbidden Sky (2018)
 Era: Medieval Age (2019)
 Pandemic Legacy: Season 0 (2020)
 Daybreak (upcoming)
 Forbidden Jungle (upcoming)

Charity 
According to Leacock, 5% of his design royalty for Pandemic products is donated directly to Medecins Sans Frontieres.

References

Living people
American game designers
Year of birth missing (living people)
Place of birth missing (living people)